Guede L'Orage is a lwa in the Haitian Vodou religion. This spirit usually only manifests during storms.

Footnotes

Notes

References 

Haitian Vodou gods
Sky and weather deities